Pirates of the Caribbean: Jack Sparrow is a series of novels for young readers written by Liz Braswell, Carla Jablonski, Tui T. Sutherland and other authors under the shared pseudonym of Rob Kidd. The series is published by Disney Press and was written as a literary companion to the Pirates of the Caribbean films. The books are about Jack Sparrow's teen years before he becomes a pirate. It is followed by Pirates of the Caribbean: The Price of Freedom and the series Pirates of the Caribbean: Legends of the Brethren Court, set thirteen years before the film Pirates of the Caribbean: The Curse of the Black Pearl.

Books in the series

Characters

Captain Jack Sparrow - An adolescent stowaway (not yet a pirate) with an unknown past. In the books, he is depicted as more of an adventurer than a pirate. He is the Captain of the Barnacle. 
Fitzwilliam P. Dalton III - A young British aristocrat tired of his rich and pampered lifestyle, Fitzwilliam joins Jack's crew in the first book. Jack gave him the nickname "Fitzy".
Arabella Smith - An adolescent barmaid being raised by her drunkard father, who owns a tavern in Tortuga. Arabella has a very retentive memory and is a walking encyclopedia of random facts. She has tousled auburn hair and bites her bottom lip when uncomfortable or worried.
Jean Magliore - A thirteen-year-old boy from New Orleans, he often spouts French phrases. Jean has a liking for Arabella.
Constance Magliore - Jean's sister. She was turned into a cat by Tia Dalma.
Tumen - A Mayan from the Yucatán sold into slavery by pirates.
Captain Torrents - A vicious pirate captain with the ability to control storms that Jack and his crew faced in the first book.
Left Foot Louis - Notorious pirate with two left feet that kidnapped Arabella's mother and also searched for the Sword of Cortés. Left Foot Louis has a scarred face and seeks revenge on Constance and Jean.
Hernán Cortés - A Spanish conquistador. His ghost appears in the fourth book.
Moctezuma - The former Aztec emperor. His spirit battles the ghost of his sworn enemy Cortés.
Madame Minuit - A powerful and seductive creole witch from New Orleans, Jean's hometown, with the power over snakes.  She stole a magical amulet from Tumen's people, resulting in the blame placed on him and exile from his own people.
Tim Hawk - A young boy who was under the control of Madame Minuit but later turned against her and joined the Barnacles crew.
Laura Smith - Notorious pirate who is also Arabella Smith's mother. She seems to have a very bad relationship with her daughter, Arabella, as the two are constantly arguing. Like her daughter, Laura has a habit of biting her bottom lip.
Mr. Silverback - Strange pirate of the ship, Fleur de la Mort. He has a crystal leg and tooth (which enables strange powers.) He is also somehow linked to the Sun and Stars Medallion. For a time, he possessed the Silver bullet.
Tia Dalma - A powerful voodoo priestess and old acquaintance of Jack Sparrow.
Davy Jones - A mighty heartless, immortal seaman and ruler over many siren and mermaid kingdoms in the ocean. 
Mr. Reece - The first mate of Laura Smith. He is blue-eyed and wears a red bandanna like Jack. He is also quite handsome and a skilled fighter.
Captain Teague - Jack's father and the Captain of the Misty Lady. Calls Jack by the name "Jackie", and is Keeper of the Pirate Code.
Billy Turner - He later becomes Bootstrap Bill Turner. He makes his first appearance in Poseidon's Peak. He and Arabella are in love.

References

Pirates of the Caribbean
Novels about pirates
Works published under a pseudonym
Novels based on films